Loon Lake is a lake in Cook County, Minnesota, off of the Gunflint Trail.

Loon Lake is stocked with lake trout by the Minnesota Department of Natural Resources.

References

Lakes of Minnesota
Lakes of Cook County, Minnesota